Representative Assembly elections were held in French Togoland on 9 and 30 December 1951.

Results

Elected members
Sylvanus Olympio was the sole elected member for the Committee of Togolese Unity.

References

1951
1951 elections in Africa
1951 in French Togoland
1951
December 1951 events in Africa